A special economic zone (SEZ) is an area in which the business and trade laws are different from the rest of the country. SEZs are located within a country's national borders, and their aims include increasing trade balance, employment, increased investment, job creation and effective administration. To encourage businesses to set up in the zone, financial policies are introduced. These policies typically encompass investing, taxation, trading, quotas, customs and labour regulations. Additionally, companies may be offered tax holidays, where upon establishing themselves in a zone, they are granted a period of lower taxation.

The creation of special economic zones by the host country may be motivated by the desire to attract foreign direct investment (FDI). The benefits a company gains by being in a special economic zone may mean that it can produce and trade goods at a lower price, aimed at being globally competitive. In some countries, the zones have been criticized for being little more than labor camps, with workers denied fundamental labor rights.

Definition
The definition of an SEZ is determined individually by each country. According to the World Bank in 2008, the modern-day special economic zone typically includes a "geographically limited area, usually physically secured (fenced-in); single management or administration; eligibility for benefits based upon physical location within the zone; separate customs area (duty-free benefits) and streamlined procedures."

History
Modern SEZs appeared from the late-1950s in industrial countries. The first was in Shannon Airport in Clare, Ireland. Some tax-free jurisdictions such as the Cayman Islands offer technology companies a way to keep their IP offshore in a Special Economic Zone (see Cayman Enterprise City).

From the 1970s onward, zones providing labour-intensive manufacturing have been established, starting in Latin America and East Asia. The first in China following the opening of China in 1979 by Deng Xiaoping was the Shenzhen Special Economic Zone, which encouraged foreign investment and simultaneously accelerated industrialization in this region. These zones attracted investment from multinational corporations. China continues to maintain Special Economic Zones and certain open coastal areas.

Numerous African countries have set up SEZs in connection with China, including over the period 1990 to 2018 establishing SEZs in Nigeria (two), Zambia, Djibouti, Kenya, Mauritius, Mauritania, Egypt, and Algeria. Generally, the Chinese government takes a hands-off approach, leaving it to Chinese enterprises to work to establish such zones (although it does provide support in the form of grants, loans,  and subsidies, including support via the China Africa Development Fund).  The Forum on China-Africa Cooperation promotes these SEZs heavily.

Types
The term special economic zone can include:
Free-trade zones (FTZ)
Export processing zones (EPZ)
Free economic zones (FZ/ FEZ)
Industrial parks / estates (IE)
Free ports
Bonded logistics parks (BLP)
Urban enterprise zones

The World Bank created the following table to clarify distinctions between types of special economic zones:

See also
 List of special economic zones by country
 Exclusive economic zone
 Urban enterprise zone
 Four Asian Tigers
 Free economic zone

References

Further reading
 Chee Kian Leong, (2007) A Tale of Two Countries: Openness and Growth in China and India, Dynamics, Economic Growth, and International Trade, DEGIT Conference Paper pdf
 Chee Kian Leong, (forthcoming) Special economic zones and growth in China and India: an empirical investigation, International Economics and Economic Policy. link
 Thomas Farole, (2011) Special Economic Zones in Africa: Comparing Performance and Learning from Global Experiences'', Washington, DC, World Bank

External links 
 Шмонов Н.Н. «Историческое исследование проблем развития особых экономических зон»
 Bangladesh Export Processing Zone Authority BEPZA
 South Kazakhstan "Ontustyk" special economic zone
 Indian Special Economic Zones
 Export Processing Zones Authority Pakistan
 PEZA Philippines website
 India Special Economic zones map
 Open Joint Stock Company "Special Economic Zones" (Russia) 
 U.S.S.R. Special Economic Zones 
 India: Citizens group demand moratorium on SEZs OneWorld South Asia

 
Foreign direct investment
Commercial policy
Economic development policy